Richard Ernest York (25 April 1899 – 9 December 1969), also known as Dicky York, which is often also spelled as Dickie York, was an English footballer, who in addition to a long club career with Aston Villa in the Football League appeared twice for the England national team. A winger, he spent 16 years at Villa from 1915 to 1931, and was on the losing team in the 1924 FA Cup Final. He later had brief spells with Port Vale and Brierley Hill Alliance.

Early and personal life
Richard Ernest York was born on 25 April 1899 in Handsworth, Staffordshire. He was the eldest of two children to Richard and Edith Mary (née Bagley); his father was a press tool maker. York enlisted in the Army on 8 May 1917, and by April 1918 had transferred to the Royal Air Force. He married Constance G. Wright in 1923. He ran decorating and plumbing business in Birmingham after retiring from football.

Club career 
York started his career with his local clubs Handsworth Royal and Birchfield Rangers. In March 1915 he joined Aston Villa as a young amateur, signing professional forms in August 1919. He also guested for Chelsea and Boscombe Town during World War I. He scored one goal in 17 games for Villa in 1919–20, but did not feature in the 1920 FA Cup Final, which ended in a 1–0 victory over Huddersfield Town at Stamford Bridge. He appeared just 11 times in 1920–21, before going on to make 47 appearances in the 1921–22 campaign, as the "Villans" finished fifth in the First Division. He scored nine goals in 37 games in 1922–23 and five goals in 43 games in 1923–24. He also appeared at Wembley in the 1924 FA Cup Final, in a 2–0 defeat to Newcastle United. He scored seven goals in 34 matches in 1924–25, before hitting 20 goals in 44 appearances in 1925–26. He bagged 13 goals in 43 games in 1926–27, before being limited to just four goals in 30 appearances in 1927–28. He rediscovered his scoring form with 18 strikes in 48 matches in 1928–29, before hitting seven goals in 32 games in 1929–30. However he played just four times in the 1930–31 campaign, as Villa finished second in the league with an English record of 128 top-flight league goals scored.

He joined Port Vale in June 1931, making his debut in a 3–1 win at Plymouth Argyle on 29 August. He was a first team regular until he was struck by injury in December of that year. After his recovery he played infrequently, and ended the 1931–32 season with five goals in 26 Second Division appearances. He left the Old Recreation Ground and was transferred to Brierley Hill Alliance in August 1932.

International career 
He made two appearances for England, both 1–0 defeats to Scotland in April 1922 and April 1926.

Career statistics

Club statistics
Source:

International statistics

Honours 
Aston Villa
FA Cup runner-up: 1924

References 

1899 births
1969 deaths
Footballers from Handsworth, West Midlands
British Army personnel of World War I
Royal Air Force personnel of World War I
Association football wingers
English footballers
England international footballers
Chelsea F.C. wartime guest players
Aston Villa F.C. players
Port Vale F.C. players
Brierley Hill Alliance F.C. players
English Football League players
English Football League representative players
FA Cup Final players